Diego Ruiz Sanz (born 5 February 1982) is a Spanish middle distance runner who specializes in the 1500 metres.

He won the silver medal at the 2009 European Indoor Championships.

Personal bests
400 metres - 47.67 s (2001)
800 metres - 1:46.40 min (2008)
1500 metres - 3:33.18 min (2011)
Mile run - 3:57.21 min (2011)
3000 metres - 7:52.86 min (2010, indoor)

References

1982 births
Living people
Spanish male middle-distance runners
Athletes (track and field) at the 2012 Summer Olympics
Olympic athletes of Spain
21st-century Spanish people